Neer Bikram Shah, also known as Nir Shah, is a senior Nepalese film actor, director, producer, poet, songwriter, and businessman. He is considered one of the leading actors in Nepali cinema history and an actor with multiple identities. He is related to the royal family of Nepal.

Film career

Neer Shah is the producer or co-producer of many Nepali movies. He has also directed several Nepali movies produced by himself, including Basudev, Pachchis Basanta, Basanti, and a Nepal Bhasa movie Rajamati. He is also a co-producer of the Oscar-nominated film Himalaya – l'enfance d'un chef, which was co-produced and directed by the French movie maker Eric Valli. The film, also released as Caravan (in Canada) and Himalaya (in Denmark and France), was the first film from Nepal to win an Oscar nomination.

Shah has also played antagonistic as well as other character roles in movies such as Prem Pinda and Balidan. He has also appeared in a few Bollywood movies as a guest artist. Shah has also penned down many Nepali and Nepal Bhasa songs. He has also done the scriptwriting for a few of his films.

In 2001, he served on the jury of Film South Asia '01, the festival of South Asian documentaries, along with Firdous Azim and Shyam Benegal.

Filmography

As an actor

Service 

Shah was the first head and founder of Nepal Television (NTV), the first TV station in Nepal, and is the chairman of Shangri-La TV (STV), a film production and microwave TV distribution company. STV produced many programmes for NTV and also provided the cable television network in Kathmandu valley. Shah holds 33 per cent equity in a United Kingdom-based firm, Galaxy, which is involved in telecasting Nepalese TV channels overseas. Along with Nirmal Nicholas Paul, he set up a production company called "888 Films", that produces Nepalese and Hindi films. Another of his companies, National Studio, provides training in various fields of cinema production. He is also one of the proprietors of New Century Pictures Pvt.Ltd., a film production company. Shah also serves on the Governing Council of College of Journalism and Mass Communication in Nepal.

In 2002, he was felicitated by the Minister for Culture, Tourism and Civil Aviation in recognition of his contribution in the "promotion of Nepalese art and culture and tourism industry".

He currently lives in London.

Royal affiliation 

One of his two brothers, Kumar Khadga Bikram Shah, was married to one of three former King Gyanendra Shah's sisters, Princess Sharada Shah. Both his brother and sister-in-law were killed in the infamous Royal Massacre of 2001.
His other brother is Lalit Bikram Shah.

Politics
Shah is also affiliated with the Nepali Congress. Earlier, close to CPN (Maoist Centre), he became close to the Nepali Congress after he was appointed as director of Nepal Television during the period of Bimalendra Nidhi as communication minister.

Awards 
 Chinnalata Geet Puraskar (2011).

References

External links
 

Nepalese film directors
Nepalese songwriters
Nepalese screenwriters
Living people
20th-century Nepalese male actors
21st-century Nepalese male actors
1967 births
Order of Gorkha Dakshina Bahu
Actors from Kathmandu
21st-century Nepalese screenwriters
20th-century Nepalese screenwriters
20th-century Nepalese nobility
21st-century Nepalese nobility
20th-century Nepalese film directors
Nepali Congress politicians from Bagmati Province